The following events occurred in May 1943:

May 1, 1943 (Saturday)
More than 480,000 American coal miners walked off of the job a minute after midnight, when the United Mine Workers' contract with the nation's mining companies expired. U.S. President Roosevelt notified UMWA President John L. Lewis to cease the wartime work stoppage by 10:00 am, an order which was ignored, and then issued an Executive Order directing that "The Secretary of the Interior is authorized and directed to take immediate possession so far as may be necessary or desirable, of any and all mines producing coal in which a strike or stoppage has occurred or is threatened ...". At the time, there was only a three-week supply of coal for American steel manufacturers and ten days' supply for some railroads. The strike would resume on June 1.
Over 800 British Empire soldiers and sailors died when the troopship Erinpura was sunk north of Benghazi by German bombers.  One of the bombs struck a hold full of ammunition, and the ship went down in four minutes, taking with it 600 African troops from Basutoland (now Botswana), 140 Jewish soldiers from Palestine, 54 sailors from British India, and five English crew. 
In Tunisia, the Battle of Hill 609 ended as the U.S. Army's II Corps drove Germany's Afrika Korps from a strategic position. An author would note that the battle, the first clear cut victory of U.S. forces in the North African Campaign, was "the American Army's coming-of-age."
The Ford Motor Company fired 141 employees, mostly African-American, from its aluminum and steel plants in River Rouge, Michigan, because of labor disputes.
Count Fleet won the Kentucky Derby.
Born: Ian Dunn, Scottish gay and paedophile rights activist, in Glasgow (d. 1998)

May 2, 1943 (Sunday)
The top secret project of deception code-named Operation Mincemeat continued at the Spanish town of Huelva, where a funeral was held for Major William Martin of Britain's Royal Marines, whose body had washed ashore on April 30. Major Martin was, in reality, a homeless Welshman named Glyndwr Michael, who had died on January 28 and whose body was used to deceive German intelligence regarding the starting point for an Allied invasion.
President Roosevelt went on nationwide radio to talk about the need to end the coal strike, then directed his comments to the strikers themselves, saying "You miners have sons in the Army and Navy and Marine Corps ... I only wish I could tell you what they think of the stoppage of work in the coal mines."
Twenty Japanese bombers and Zero fighters carried out a significant raid on Darwin, Australia,
The German submarine U-465 was sunk in the Bay of Biscay by a Short Sunderland of No. 461 Squadron RAAF.
Born: Mustafa Nadarevic, Yugoslav and Bosnian actor and comedian, in Banja Luka (d. 2020)
Died: Viktor Lutze, 52, Chief of Staff for the SA Sturmabteilung, a day after being fatally injured in a single car accident.

May 3, 1943 (Monday)
The United States Supreme Court invalidated, 5–4, a city ordinance in Jeannette, Pennsylvania that required members of the Jehovah's Witnesses religious denomination to pay for a peddles' license in order to distribute religious literature. The city ordinance required each individual distributor to pay $10 per day. The ruling, in Murdock v. Pennsylvania, invalidated similar ordinances in Alabama, Arizona and Kansas as a violation of the constitutional guarantees of freedom of religion.
The Battle of the Campobasso Convoy was fought off Cape Bon over the night of May 3–4. The result was a British victory as one Italian merchant ship and one fleet torpedo boat were sunk with the Royal Navy taking only light damage in return.
Died: U.S. Army Lieutenant General Frank Maxwell Andrews, 59, Commander of U.S. Forces in Europe, in the crash of a B-24 bomber during bad weather in Iceland. Andrews Air Force Base, near Washington, D.C., was named in his honor.

May 4, 1943 (Tuesday)
A bill to eliminate federal income tax for all Americans for an entire year failed to pass by four votes, 202–206. The legislation, based on ideas proposed by New York Federal Reserve Bank chairman Beardsley Ruml, was replaced by a "pay as you go" Robertson-Forand bill that virtually eliminated the 1942 income taxes for 90% of Americans.
The German submarine U-109 was sunk with the loss of all hands in the Atlantic Ocean by a B-24 Liberator of No. 86 Squadron RAF.
The German submarines U-439 and U-659 collided with each other west of Cape Ortegal, Spain and both sank.

May 5, 1943 (Wednesday)
The Vatican Secretary of State sent a request to the government of the Nazi-controlled Slovak Republic, requesting the exclusion of Jews "who have entered the Catholic religion" from the list of persons to be deported to Nazi concentration camps. The office of Prime Minister Vojtech Tuka gave its response on May 28, pledging that converts would be kept in local concentration camps, separate from other Jews, "and given every opportunity to fulfill their Christian religion."
The German submarine U-638 was depth charged and sunk northeast of Newfoundland by the British corvette Sunflower.
Born: Michael Palin, British comedian, in Sheffield

May 6, 1943 (Thursday)
Admiral Ernest J. King, the U.S. Chief of Naval Operations, ordered the creation of Naval Combat Demolition Units, after the success, in September, of a group of U.S. Navy divers who had destroyed nets that had prevented American ships from entering Morocco's Sebou River.
Six German submarines (U-125, U-192, U-438, U-531, U-630 and U-638) were sunk after sinking 12 ships from Convoy ONS 5 in the last major North Atlantic U-boat "wolfpack" attack of the war.
Born: Andreas Baader, West German terrorist and leader of the Red Army Faction, known as the Baader-Meinhof Gang; in Munich (d. 1977)

May 7, 1943 (Friday)
Tunis and Bizerte were liberated by Allied troops, with Bizerte falling to the Americans at 4:15 pm local time, and the Tunisian capital being conquered five minutes later by the British First Army.
Sex symbol and film star Mae West was granted a final divorce from her husband, Frank Szatkus, whom she had married on April 29, 1911. The couple had been separated for more than thirty years.
The German submarines U-447 and U-663 were depth charged and sunk by Allied aircraft in the eastern Atlantic and Bay of Biscay, respectively.
Born: Peter Carey, Australian novelist, in Bacchus Marsh, Victoria
Died: Fethi Okyar, 63, Prime Minister of Turkey, 1924–1925

May 8, 1943 (Saturday)
The U.S. Joint Chiefs of Staff approved the recommendations contained in the Strategic Plan for the Defeat of Japan, with the objective of the unconditional surrender of the Japanese Empire.
Three Japanese destroyers were sunk on the same day. The Kagerō was bombed and sunk southwest of Rendova by American aircraft; the Kuroshio struck a mine and sank near Kolombangara in the Solomon Islands; and the Oyashio was disabled by a mine and then sunk by aircraft near Kolombangara.
Count Fleet won the Preakness Stakes.
The Western film The Ox-Bow Incident starring Henry Fonda premiered in New York City.
Died: Mordechai Anielewicz, 24, Jewish leader of the Warsaw Ghetto Uprising. Anielewicz, head of the resistance group Żydowska Organizacja Bojowa, apparently killed himself after the Nazi SS surrounded the ZOB command post at 18 Miła Street in Warsaw.

May 9, 1943 (Sunday)
Francisco Franco, the fascist dictator of Spain, which remained neutral during World War II, spoke in favor of world peace, "declaring that neither the Axis nor the Allies could destroy the other". Franco, who had won the Spanish Civil War with assistance from both Germany and Italy, spoke in the city of Almería as the Axis powers were surrendering to the Allies in North Africa.
A Junkers Ju 88 fitted with the new Lichtenstein radar set was secretly flown from Norway to Scotland by a crew of defectors possibly led by a British intelligence agent. The analysis of this new advanced equipment and other data about the tactics of German night-fighters would be vital to the Allies.
Died: Wilmeth Sidat-Singh, 25, African-American college football and basketball star and member of the Tuskegee Airmen, was killed after the engine of his plane failed during a training mission.

May 10, 1943 (Monday)
On the day that the Enabling Act of 1933 was set to expire by its terms, Adolf Hitler signed an order extending his dictatorship indefinitely. Published in the Reich Law Gazette, the decree stated "The Reich government will continue to exercise the powers bestowed on it by virtue of the law of March 24, 1933. I reserve for myself the obtaining of a confirmation of these powers of the Reich government by the Greater German Reichstag," although the German parliament was never called back into session by Hitler again.
Hitler approved Operation Citadel, the attack on the Kursk salient, for June.
To mark the tenth anniversary of the Nazi book burnings in Germany, the 300 largest libraries in the United States flew their flags at half-mast.
Born: Dick Darman, Director of the U.S. Office of Management and Budget 1989–1993; in Charlotte, North Carolina (d. 2008)

May 11, 1943 (Tuesday)
An assault force of 3,000 troops from the 7th U.S. Infantry Division invaded Attu in the Aleutian Islands, in an attempt to expel occupying Japanese forces. The island, part of Alaska, had been renamed Atsuta by Japan, and was a supply point for the Aleutian island of Kiska, still in use by Japan for a submarine operating base.
U.S. Secretary of the Navy Frank Knox inadvertently gave a clue that Allied forces intended to use Sicily for an invasion of Europe, potentially undermining the British disinformation campaign of Operation Mincemeat to convince German intelligence that the attack would be made from Greece and Sardinia. Ironically, Knox's comment that "Possession of Sicily by the Allies would obviously be a tremendous asset" was interpreted as an obviously clumsy attempt at deception, which Nazi Propaganda Minister Joseph Goebbels would describe as "baseless rumors and attempts at a smoke screen".
The German submarine U-528 was sunk in the Atlantic Ocean by a British aircraft and Royal Navy sloop Fleetwood.

May 12, 1943 (Wednesday)
TRIDENT, the first wartime conference between U.S. President Roosevelt and UK Prime Minister Churchill, began in Washington, D.C., and continued for 16 days. Churchill and his entourage had arrived in Washington from New York the night before after being secretly transported across the North Atlantic Ocean on the RMS Queen Mary.
Colonel General Hans-Jürgen von Arnim and General Giovanni Messe, commanders, respectively, of the German Army and the Italian Army in North Africa, both surrendered themselves to the Allies, although Arnim refused to sign terms of unconditional surrender of German forces. Arnim and many of his troops had been cornered at the Cape Bon peninsula in Tunisia, near the town of Ste. Marie du Zit, by the 4th Indian Division of the British forces.
The Battle of West Hubei began during the Second Sino-Japanese War.
Maliq Bushati, the figurehead Prime Minister of Albania during Italian occupation, was replaced by Eqrem Libohova. 
The German submarines U-89, U-186 and U-456 were all lost to enemy action in the Atlantic Ocean. Most notably, U-456 was damaged by the new Fido homing torpedo dropped by a B-24 of No. 86 Squadron RAF before being finished off by the British destroyer Opportune.
The Japanese submarine I-31 was sunk off of the coast of Alaska, near Attu Island, by the destroyer USS Edwards.
Died: Szmul Zygielbojm, 48, Jewish-Polish politician, by an overdose of pills while in exile in London. His suicide note closed with the words, "having failed to achieve success in my life, I hope that my death may jolt the indifference of those who, perhaps even in this extreme moment, could save the Jews who are still alive in Poland".

May 13, 1943 (Thursday)
The North African Campaign came to an end after nearly three years, as the 164th Infantry Division of Germany's Afrika Korps laid down its weapons and its commander, Major General Kurt Freiherr von Liebenstein became the last of the Axis officers to surrender in Africa. The commanding British Field Marshal, Sir Harold Alexander, sent word to Prime Minister Churchill, saying that "It is my duty to report that the Tunis campaign is over. All enemy resistance has ceased." During the week, 150,000 Germans and Italians became prisoners of war of the Allies.
The German submarine U-753 was depth charged and sunk in the Atlantic Ocean by a Short Sunderland of No. 423 Squadron RCAF and two ships.
The comedy film The More the Merrier starring Jean Arthur, Joel McCrea and Charles Coburn was released.

May 14, 1943 (Friday)

The AHS Centaur, an Australian hospital ship, was torpedoed and sunk near North Stradbroke Island, off of the coast of Queensland, by Japanese submarine I-177, killing 268 of the 363 persons on board. There were no patients on board at the time, but the ship was carrying 245 Australian and British medical personnel. 
The German submarines U-235, U-236 and U-237 were all sunk at Kiel in an American air raid. All three U-boats would be raised, repaired and returned to service.
The Japanese submarine Ro-102 was sunk in the Pacific Ocean by two American patrol boats.
The German submarine U-640 was depth charged and sunk off Cape Farewell, Greenland by an American PBY Catalina.
The U.S. Public Roads Administration reported that only a few states were observing the 35 mile per hour speed limit that had been imposed nationally during wartime, with vehicles traveling as fast as 45 mph in Minnesota.
Born: 
Ólafur Ragnar Grímsson, President of Iceland from 1996 to 2016, in Ísafjörður
Jack Bruce, Scottish musician and songwriter, in Bishopbriggs (d. 2014)

May 15, 1943 (Saturday)

Sidi Muhammad VII al-Munsif, the Bey of Tunis, was forced to abdicate by France's General Henri Giraud. Replacing al-Munsif was his son, Muhammad VIII al-Amin. Two days later, the al-Munsif would be put on a ship and sent to Madagascar, along with his harem of 25 wives. The Bey had elected to remain in Tunis after the Axis occupation began and had collaborated with the German authorities, who had made him a figurehead King of Tunisia.
At an airbase at Carlsbad, New Mexico, Dr. Louis Fieser, the chemist who had developed napalm, conducted the first test of the experimental "bat bomb", with a timed 0.6 ounce explosive attached to a Mexican free-tailed bat. After a demonstration with dummy bombs showed that the bats would, as planned, seek shelter in buildings, Dr. Fieser attached live explosives to six dormant bats for a demonstration in front of cameras. The bats woke up before detonation, then flew towards the wooden control tower, barracks, and other buildings and set a fire that destroyed much of the base.
The Irish-operated steamship Irish Oak was torpedoed and sunk in the Atlantic Ocean by German submarine U-607 despite sailing as a clearly marked neutral vessel.
The German submarines U-176 and U-266 were lost to enemy action in the Atlantic Ocean.
Operation Checkmate ended with all seven British commandos being captured after managing to sink one minesweeper. 
Died: Horst Hannig, 21, German Luftwaffe fighter ace, was shot down over northern France

May 16, 1943 (Sunday)
Operation Chastise was carried out by nineteen bombers of the Royal Air Force on German dams in the Ruhr valley industrial region, causing massive flooding and loss of life. The Moehne River dam and the Eder dam contained two-thirds of the water stored for the Ruhr basin. German radio reported that at least 711 people were confirmed dead, and claimed that 341 of them had been Allied prisoners of war. "That night", German Armaments Minister Albert Speer would write later, "employing just a few bombers, the British came close to a success which would have been greater than anything they had achieved hitherto with a commitment of thousands of bombers. But they made a single mistake which puzzles me to this day: They divided their forces and that same night destroyed the Eder Valley dam, although it had nothing whatsoever to do with the supply of water to the Ruhr."
The end of the Warsaw Ghetto Uprising was complete as SS Polizeifuhrer Jürgen Stroop sent his triumphant dispatch to Berlin, announcing that "The former Jewish quarter of Warsaw is no longer in existence. The large-scale action was terminated at 2015 hours by blowing up the Warsaw Synagogue ... Total number of Jews dealt with 56,065 including both Jews caught and Jews whose extermination can be proved." The operation had been commenced on April 19.
The German submarine U-182 was sunk near Madeira by the destroyer USS MacKenzie, while the U-463 was sunk in the Bay of Biscay by a Handley Page Halifax of No. 58 Squadron RAF.

May 17, 1943 (Monday)
The BRUSA Agreement was signed between the governments of Britain and the United States to exchange personnel and wartime intelligence between the cryptanalysis agencies of the two nations, along with those of Canada and Australia. 
The ten surviving RAF bombers out of 19 from the "Dam Busters" returned, though only six would survive to the end of the war.
The United States Army contracted with the University of Pennsylvania's Moore School to develop the computer ENIAC.
The Memphis Belle's crew became the first aircrew in the 8th Air Force to complete its 25-mission tour of duty. The aircraft and crew, first to survive their tour, returned to the United States to assist in publicity for the sale of War Bonds.
The German submarines U-128, U-646 and U-657 were all lost to enemy action in the Atlantic Ocean.
Born: Tuanku Syed Sirajuddin, King of Malaysia from 2001 to 2006, and Raja of Perlis since 2000; in Arau
Died: Montagu Love, 66, British actor

May 18, 1943 (Tuesday)
With an Allied invasion of Italy imminent, Pope Pius XII sent an appeal to U.S. President Roosevelt, asking that American bombers spare the destruction of Rome, noting that its "many treasured shrines of religion and art" were "the precious heritage not of one people but of all human and Christian civilization".
Having captured Tunisia, the Allies began the bombing of the Italian island of Pantelleria, 100 miles from Tunis. Pantelleria would be invaded without opposition on June 11, and would serve as a base for attacks on the larger Italian island of Sicily, 60 miles away.
Born: Jimmy Snuka (James William Reiher), Fijian-born American professional wrestler (d. 2017)

May 19, 1943 (Wednesday)
Following years of experimentation to test the safety of the first antibiotic drug, the United States Army Medical Corps cleared the release of penicillin for use in all military hospitals. Two days later, the first patient to receive the drug would be an unidentified U.S. Army soldier. Although the bacteria-killing properties of the mold Penicillium chrysogenum had been discovered by Alexander Fleming 15 years earlier, production was limited until 1942, when a potent strain of the mold was discovered on a cantaloupe that had been discarded from a market in Peoria, Illinois, where research was being performed on synthesizing the drug. The "Peoria strain" was found by microbiologist Dorothy I. Fennell to yield 50 times as much penicillin as previously tested strains, making mass production possible. Mary Hunt, a technician of the lab, is usually given credit for discovering the cantaloupe that contained the mold although the laboratory's supervisor, Kenneth B. Raper, would tell a reporter in 1976 that "A housewife in town knew we were looking for moldy food, and she brought in the moldy cantaloupe," and handed it over to a guard, then departed without ever leaving her name.

Winston Churchill addressed a joint session of the United States Congress (as well as a national radio audience), reviewing the course of the war and reassuring his audience of Britain's dedication to its alliance with the United States.  Churchill noted that "We will wage war at your side against Japan while there is breath in our bodies and while blood flows in our veins."
German Propaganda Minister Joseph Goebbels declared that, after 60 days of work, Berlin was now Judenfrei—free of Jews.
The German submarine U-273 was depth charged and sunk in the Atlantic Ocean by a Lockheed Hudson of No. 269 Squadron RAF.
German submarine U-954 was sunk southeast of Cape Farewell, Greenland by British warships. Among the crew who perished in the sinking was the son of Admiral Karl Dönitz, Peter Dönitz.
Born: Helena Quinn, Australian-born American theoretical physicist, in Melbourne
Died: Kristjan Raud, 77, Estonian painter

May 20, 1943 (Thursday)
The United States Court for China, a federal civil and criminal court that had been based in Shanghai since 1906, ceased operations upon the ratification by the U.S. of a treaty with China, signed on January 11, relinquishing extraterritoriality privileges.
Joseph E. Davies, the former American ambassador to the Soviet Union, met secretly with Soviet Premier Stalin to deliver a letter from U.S. President Roosevelt, proposing "an informal and completely simple visit for a few days between you and me" during the summer, "either on your side or my side of the Bering Straits". The invitation was kept secret even from British Prime Minister Churchill.
The German submarine U-258 was depth charged and sunk in the Atlantic Ocean by a B-24 of No. 120 Squadron RAF.
The National Advisory Committee for Aeronautics' Aircraft Engine Research Laboratory (now the Glenn Research Center) held its dedication ceremony in Cleveland, Ohio.
Died: John Stone Stone, 73, American physicist and inventor

May 21, 1943 (Friday)
The government of Bulgaria, under pressure from its Axis partner, Germany, agreed to surrender the 25,000 Jewish residents of Sofia for deportation to concentration camps. Within three days, massive protests were organized and the plan was foiled. The city's Jews were resettled in labor camps within Bulgaria, with the men to be used for public works, but no further attempts at extermination were made.
Tokyo Radio announced the April 18 death of the commander of Japan's Navy, Admiral Isoroku Yamamoto, who had been killed when his plane was shot down over the Solomon Islands by an American fighter plane. The announcer, whose voice broke, said that Yamamoto "engaged in combat with the enemy and met a gallant death in a warplane", giving the first reports of the military leader's death, which had not been announced in the United States. President Roosevelt, who had ordered Operation Vengeance, was asked by reporters for a comment, and his sarcastic official statement was "Gosh!".
The German submarine U-303 was torpedoed and sunk in the Mediterranean off Toulon by the British submarine Sickle.

May 22, 1943 (Saturday)
The Comintern was dissolved in Moscow. The Communist International, which had been founded with the goal of "formenting of world revolution", had been voted out of existence by its executive committee on May 15 and an announcement was made in Pravda. In that the Soviet Union had joined the Allies after the invasion of the USSR by Germany in 1941, the declaration was believed by Western observers to be a signal by Joseph Stalin that the Soviet Union intended to stop its policy of trying to foment revolution in the other nations until after World War II.
British Commandos carried out Operation Farrier, a raid on the Yugoslavian island of Mljet.
The German submarine U-569 was scuttled in the Atlantic Ocean after being depth charged and damaged by two Grumman TBM Avenger aircraft from the escort carrier USS Bogue.
Born:
Tommy John, American major league baseball player, in Terre Haute, Indiana
Betty Williams, Northern Irish political activist, and 1976 Nobel Peace Prize laureate, in Belfast (d. 2020)
Died: Helen Taft, 81, First Lady of the United States 1909–1913 and widow of President William Howard Taft

May 23, 1943 (Sunday)
The heaviest air raid in history, up to that time, began as the Royal Air Force dropped 2,000 tons of bombs on Dortmund, topping the record of 1,500 tons dropped on Duisburg on May 12.
The Italian submarine  was depth charged and sunk west of Portugal by two British warships.
The German submarine U-752 was sunk in the Atlantic Ocean by a rocket attack from Fairey Swordfish aircraft of 819 Squadron, Fleet Air Arm from the British escort carrier Archer.

May 24, 1943 (Monday)
After Allied forces in the North Atlantic sank 22 of the 60 German U-boats in the first two weeks of May, Grand Admiral Karl Dönitz ordered the remaining submarines to halt their attacks on Allied convoys, and to make "a temporary shift of operation to areas less endangered by aircraft". Because of an improvement in Allied radar and in air patrols, "Black May" would see the sinking of 41 of the German subs in a single month.
Died: Parker Corning, 69, seven-term U.S. Congressman and businessman who "once a millionaire many times over, died essentially broke"

May 25, 1943 (Tuesday)
At the Auschwitz concentration camp in Poland, a group of 1,035 Gypsies (507 men and 528 women) were killed in a single day. SS personnel, armed with lists of the persons to be exterminated, went around to each of the barracks, and took the condemned to the gas chambers.
The German submarine U-414 was depth charged and sunk northwest of Ténès, Algeria by corvette HMS Vetch, and the U-467 was depth charged and sunk in the North Atlantic by an American PBY Catalina.
Born: 
Jessi Colter, American singer and composer, in Phoenix, Arizona
Leslie Uggams, American singer and actress, in New York City

May 26, 1943 (Wednesday)

Edwin Barclay, the President of Liberia, was welcomed by U.S. President Roosevelt to the White House, along with President-elect William Tubman. That evening, the African leader "became the first member of his race to spend the night as a guest at the Executive Mansion". In the next 45 years, Ethiopian Emperor Haile Selassie I (in 1954 and 1963), Haitian President Paul Magloire (1955), and entertainer Sammy Davis, Jr. (1973), along with their families, would be the only other black dignitaries to spend the night at the White House.
U.S. President Roosevelt ordered striking workers at three rubber companies in Akron, Ohio, to return to work. In a telegram to union leaders, Roosevelt said that unless production resumed at noon the next day, "your government will take the necessary steps to protect the interests of the nation". Nearly all of the employees at Goodyear Tire, Firestone Tire and General Tire reported for work the next day, although only a few at B.F. Goodrich complied.
The German submarine U-436 was depth charged and sunk west of Cape Ortegal by two British warships.
Died: Edsel Ford, 49, American businessman, philanthropist, and President of Ford Motor Company, died of stomach cancer

May 27, 1943 (Thursday)
The U.S. Office of War Mobilization was established by President Roosevelt under Executive Order No. 9347. James F. Byrnes would be named as the first Director.
The Fair Employment Practices Commission (FEPC) was given additional powers to punish discrimination, under Executive Order No. 9346.
The U.S. War Production Board issued an order that all contractors engaged in war production were barred from practicing racial discrimination.
"Nazi cultural functionaries" in German-occupied Paris removed the paintings of disapproved artists from the Galerie nationale du Jeu de Paume, and burned them in the museum's courtyard. Destroyed were works by André Masson, Joan Miró, Francis Picabia, Max Ernst, Fernand Léger and Pablo Picasso.
At the Polish city of Tluste, now part of Ukraine, liquidation of the Jewish population was carried out by the German SS, with 3,000 persons killed in a single day. The people were gathered in the town square, then led in groups of at least 100 to 200 to the town's Jewish cemetery, where they were shot.
Upon the conclusion of the Washington Conference, Winston Churchill flew to Algiers with General George Marshall to discuss military strategy with Eisenhower.
Born: Bruce Weitz, American TV actor (Hill Street Blues), in Norwalk, Connecticut
Died: Arthur Mee, 67, British educator and children's author who created The Children's Encyclopædia in 1908, which was published in the United States as The Book of Knowledge

May 28, 1943 (Friday)
After the Japanese forces on Attu Island had been reduced from 2,500 to 1,000 in the fight with the United States, the remaining group decided to launch suicide attacks on the American forces.
The German submarine U-304 was depth charged and sunk southeast of Cape Farewell, Greenland by a B-24 of No. 120 Squadron RAF, and the U-755 was attacked with rockets and sunk north of Majorca by a Lockheed Hudson of No. 608 Squadron RAF.
Aaron Copland's ballet Rodeo was performed for the first time, with symphonic accompaniment by Arthur Fiedler and the Boston Pops.

May 29, 1943 (Saturday)
RAF Bomber Command sent 719 aircraft to bomb Wuppertal overnight. The raid created a firestorm that killed over 3,500 people.
Norman Rockwell's illustration of Rosie the Riveter was introduced, on the cover of the Memorial Day issue of the Saturday Evening Post. Rockwell's inspiration was a 1942 song written by Redd Evans and John Jacob Loeb, and recorded by Kay Kyser, and the model for the painting was a 19-year-old telephone operator from Arlington, Vermont, Mary Doyle.
"That Old Black Magic" by Glenn Miller and His Orchestra hit #1 on the Billboard singles chart.
Died: Muhamed Mehmedbašić, 56, Bosnian revolutionary and conspirator in the 1914 assassination of Archduke Franz Ferdinand of Austria, was killed by the Ustaše, the secret police of the Nazi-sponsored Independent State of Croatia

May 30, 1943 (Sunday)

After 19 days of fighting, the United States recaptured Alaska's Attu Island from the Japanese Army, annihilating the remaining fighters "except for a few snipers". The Japanese soldiers who were not killed in battle committed mass suicide, and a search of the island found no survivors. Of the 2,500 Japanese who originally tried to hold the Alaskan island, only 28 prisoners were alive at the battle's end, while the American losses were 600 dead.
Dr. Josef Mengele began his service as a medical officer in the Auschwitz-Birkenau concentration camp, and spent the next 19 months conducting bizarre surgical experiments on the captive patients.
In a German air raid on the British coastal town of Torquay, a church was bombed, killing 35 children and four Sunday school teachers.
The British submarine HMS Untamed sank during a training exercise in the Firth of Clyde with the loss of all 35 of her crew. She was later raised, repaired and returned to service as HMS Vitality.

The four team All-American Girls Professional Baseball League (AAGPBL), the first and last professional baseball league with women players, made its debut, with the South Bend Blue Sox (Indiana) beating the Rockford Peaches (Illinois), 1–0. In the game with the two Wisconsin teams Kenosha Shamrocks beat the Racine Belles, 8–6.
Born:
James Chaney, African-American civil rights worker, in Meridian, Mississippi (killed 1964)
Gale Sayers, African-American NFL running back and Hall of Famer, in Wichita, Kansas (died 2020)

May 31, 1943 (Monday)
The "Zoot Suit Riots" erupted between military personnel and Mexican American youths in East Los Angeles.
The German submarine U-440 was sunk west of Cape Ortegal by a Short Sunderland aircraft of No. 201 Squadron RAF, and the U-563 was depth charged and sunk in the Bay of Biscay by British and Australian aircraft.
Born: 
Joe Namath, American NFL quarterback and Hall of Famer, in Beaver Falls, Pennsylvania
Sharon Gless, American TV actress (Cagney & Lacey), in Los Angeles, California
Died: Helmut Kapp, German Gestapo official, was killed by a partisan death squad in Poland

References

1943
1943-05
1943-05